Following are the results of the 2006 London Senior Football Championship, won by St. Brendan's.

The London Senior Football Championship is a GAA cup competition between the top Gaelic football clubs in London, England. The London Football championship first began in 1897 with Ireland United claiming the inaugural title.

Round 1

Qualifier round
The winners of each of these brackets go onto take up a place in the championship semi-final.

Final stages

Relegation

A
Match 22-Round Towers 1–16 -V- 2–6 St Clarets   08-Oct 
Match 23-Garryowen 1–6 -V- 3–15 Neasden Gaels	 14-Oct

B
Match 24- St Clarets -V-Shalloe Pearse – 22-Oct 
Match 25 – Garryowen -V- Harlesden Harps – 22-Oct

References

London Senior Football Championship
London Senior Football Championship
Senior Football Championship